Syngamia dentilinealis is a moth of the family Crambidae described by George Hampson in 1899. It is found on Sumatra and Java.

References

Spilomelinae
Moths described in 1899